
Szydłowiec County is a unit of territorial administration and local government (powiat) in Masovian Voivodeship, east-central Poland. It came into being on January 1, 1999, as a result of the Polish local government reforms passed in 1998.

As of 2019 its total population is 39,766, out of which the population of Szydłowiec is 11,736, and the rural population is 28,030.

Neighbouring counties
Szydłowiec County is bordered by Radom County to the north-east, Starachowice County to the south-east, Skarżysko County to the south, Końskie County to the west and Przysucha County to the north-west.

Administrative division
The county is subdivided into five gminas (one urban-rural and four rural). These are listed in the following table, in descending order of population.

References

 
Land counties of Masovian Voivodeship